The Myanmar Press Council (abbreviated MPC; formerly the Myanmar Core Press Council) is a media adjudication body which investigates and settles press disputes, compiles journalism ethics, and protects media personnel in Burma's media landscape. It was initially conceived as a Ministry of Information-appointed body consisting of 20 members, led by Chairman Khin Maung Lay, a retired Supreme Court judge, to regulate media affairs following the abolishment of pre-publication censorship. In response to local media criticism, it was reformed as an independent body involving privately owned media representatives.

See also
Censorship in Burma
Media of Burma

References

External links

Mass media complaints authorities
Burmese journalism organisations
Journalism-related professional associations
Consumer organisations in Myanmar
Regulation in Myanmar